Universidades is a station on the TransMilenio mass-transit system of Bogotá, Colombia.

Location 
The station is located in the sector of the historical center of the city, more specifically on the race 3 between the City of Lima and the 22nd street. It is accessed in two ways: through a traffic light crossing located The street 22 and by means of a tunnel that connects it with the station of the Waters.

It serves the neighborhoods The Waters, Las Vegas and Las Nieves. Also it is used by students of the different university institutions located in that zone.

It also offers proximity to the hill of Monserrate, the historical center of La Candelaria, among others.

Toponymy 
The station gets its name given the proximity of several universities and educational institutions in the area of the station. Among them they are the Universidad Jorge Tadeo Lozano, the Universidad de los Andes (Colombia), Universidad de la Salle, Universidad de La Paz, Universidad del Rosario, Universidad de La Plata, and University of America, among others, Others.

History 
This station is part of Phase III of TransMilenio, which began to be built at the end of 2009 and, after several delays related to cases of corruption and the passage obstructed by the 26th Street due to the paralyzed work of the park Bicentennial, Was delivered on April 27, 2013.

Station Services

Current Trunk Services

Station services

Complementary services 
The following complementary route also works:
  Circular  Germania -  Carrera Séptima - Tibabitá (Usaquén)

Inter-city service
This station does not have inter-city service.

See also
 List of TransMilenio Stations

References

External links

TransMilenio